Kartvelian may refer to: 

 Anything coming from or related to Georgia (country)
 Kartvelian languages
 Kartvelian alphabet, see Georgian alphabet
 Kartvelian studies
 Georgians

See also 
 Kartvelia

Language and nationality disambiguation pages